Lighthouse '69 is a live album by The Jazz Crusaders recorded in 1969 and released on the Pacific Jazz label.

Reception

AllMusic rated the album with 3 stars noting: "as usual the group transforms the music into their own brand of soulful and funky hard bop".

Track listing 
 "Get Back" (John Lennon, Paul McCartney) — 4:10
 "It's Gotta Be Real" (Larry Ramos) — 6:35
 "Willie and Laura Mae Jones" (Tony Joe White) — 3:40
 "Rubie P'Gonia" (Buster Williams) — 7:51
 "It's Your Thing" (Ronald Isley, O'Kelly Isley, Jr., Rudolph Isley) — 5:17
 "Inside the Outside" (Stix Hooper) — 6:28
 "Reflections" (Wayne Henderson) — 6:35
 "Svenska Flicka" (Joe Sample) — 4:53

Personnel 
Wayne Henderson — trombone
Wilton Felder — tenor saxophone
Joe Sample — piano, electric piano
Buster Williams — bass
Stix Hooper — drums

References 

The Jazz Crusaders live albums
1969 live albums
Pacific Jazz Records live albums
Albums recorded at the Lighthouse Café